Cyperus costaricensis is a species of sedge that is native to parts of Central America and South America.

See also 
 List of Cyperus species

References 

costaricensis
Plants described in 1982
Flora of Bolivia
Flora of Costa Rica
Flora of Panama